The official results of the Women's 10,000 metres at the 1992 Summer Olympics in Barcelona, Spain, with the final held on Friday August 7, 1992. Derartu Tulu became the first black African woman to win an Olympic Gold medal.

Liz McColgan came into the race as the returning silver medalist, the reigning world champion and a reputation behind it.  Elana Meyer came from South Africa with long distance road records.  She was considered a good chance to become the first African woman to win a gold medal.  Zhong Huandi was the silver medalist behind McColgan in the world championships but not much was known about the Chinese program.  The following year, they would scream their superiority at women's distance running, with Zhong running the second fastest 10,000 metres in history.

From the gun, McColgan assumed the lead and the rest of the field respected that.  McColgan's pace dropped many runners but Meyer, Zhong, Hellen Kimaiyo and relatively unknown 20 year old Derartu Tulu led a small pack that stayed right behind McColgan.  With 9 laps to go, Meyer, going around McColgan and running for daylight.  The only one to chase was Tulu, quickly making up the gap and running in Meyer's shadow.  Lynn Jennings made an attempt to follow but couldn't bridge the ever-widening gap.  And so it stayed until the bell, Tulu made her break, Meyer didn't have the speed and the gold medal was settled.  Tulu dropped the pace down to 67 seconds for the last lap, Meyer who had been running 73's ran another 73 taking silver by 8 seconds over Jennings who won the battle for bronze.

Medalists

Records
These were the standing world and Olympic records (in minutes) prior to the 1992 Summer Olympics.

Final

Heats

See also
 1988 Women's Olympic 10,000 metres (Seoul)
 1990 Women's European Championships 10,000 metres (Split)
 1991 Women's World Championships 10,000 metres (Tokyo)
 1993 Women's World Championships 10,000 metres (Stuttgart)
 1994 Women's European Championships 10,000 metres (Helsinki)
 1995 Women's World Championships 10,000 metres (Gothenburg)
 1996 Women's Olympic 10,000 metres (Atlanta)

References

External links
 Results

Athletics at the 1992 Summer Olympics
10,000 metres at the Olympics
1992 in women's athletics
Women's events at the 1992 Summer Olympics